Martynas Andriuškevičius (born March 12, 1986) is a Lithuanian former professional basketball player. He is a 2.18 m (7 ft 2 in) tall and 113 kg (250 lb) center. Andriuškevičius has noted perimeter skill for a player of his size, and has trained with former NBA center Arvydas Sabonis.

Professional career
When he was young, Andriuškevičius was an intriguing prospect because of his height. He developed through the youth academies at Žalgiris Kaunas, where he was tabbed as one of the top young players in the game. He played in 15 Euroleague games for the club during the 2004–05 season, and was originally projected to be one of the top picks in the 2005 NBA draft, but a disappointing season in Europe, and an apparent lack of improvement, sent his draft stock spiraling down. That season, he averaged 1.5 points and 1.1 rebounds per game, in 8.7 minutes played per game in the Euroleague.

Andriuškevičius was drafted by the Orlando Magic with the 44th pick in the 2005 NBA draft. He was then traded to the Cleveland Cavaliers, before being traded to the Chicago Bulls.

On August 18, 2006, Andriuškevičius was traded by the Cavaliers to the Chicago Bulls, for swingman Eddie Basden. On December 21, as a member of the NBA Development League's Dakota Wizards, Andriuškevičius sustained a serious head injury, when he was punched by teammate Awvee Storey, in an attack during practice in Bismarck, North Dakota. The center suffered a fractured skull, a severe concussion, and a two-centimeter hematoma (bruise) on the left side of his brain. Doctors initially thought it would be months before he could speak, but he was able to regain speech within a month, and stated his desire to play basketball within a year. Storey was suspended indefinitely. Days later, Storey had his contract terminated, and he was dismissed from the league. Andriuškevičius did not wish to pursue charges.

On March 12, 2007, Chicago Bulls doctor's cleared Andriuškevičius to participate in contact practices. The Chicago Tribune said it was, "a remarkable recovery from the serious brain injury". On April 6, head coach Scott Skiles, considered moving the player to the active roster, as he soon started practicing. However, Andriuškevičius never logged a regular season appearance for the Bulls.

On August 11, 2007, Andriuškevičius' agent announced that he would play with Joventut Badalona, and he signed with the team five days later, but his contract with the team was cancelled shortly after.

In September 2011, he signed a one-year contract with PAOK in Greece. On 11 January 2016, he signed with former Telemach League champions KK Helios Suns, on a two-year contract.

National team career
At the 2010 FIBA World Championship, Andriuškevičius played with the senior men's the Lithuanian national basketball team, and with them he won a bronze medal.

NBA career statistics

Regular season

|-
| style="text-align:left;"|
| Cleveland
| 6 || 0 || 1.5 || .000 || .000 || .000 || .7 || .0 || .3 || .0 || .0
|- class="sortbottom"
| style="text-align:center;" colspan="2"|Career
| 6 || 0 || 1.5 || .000 || .000 || .000 || .7 || .0 || .3 || .0 || .0

Awards and achievements
 2010 FIBA World Championship, Turkey:

References

External links

 FIBA.com Profile
 Eurobasket.com Profile
 Euroleague.net profile
 ACB.com Profile 
 Profile at official 2005 NBA Draft site

1986 births
Living people
2010 FIBA World Championship players
Arkansas RimRockers players
Basketball players from Kaunas
BC Neptūnas players
BC Žalgiris players
CB Lucentum Alicante players
CB Prat players
Centers (basketball)
Cleveland Cavaliers players
Dakota Wizards players
Liga ACB players
Lithuanian expatriate basketball people in Greece
Lithuanian expatriate basketball people in Poland
Lithuanian expatriate basketball people in Portugal
Lithuanian expatriate basketball people in Russia
Lithuanian expatriate basketball people in Slovenia
Lithuanian expatriate basketball people in Spain
Lithuanian expatriate basketball people in the United States
National Basketball Association players from Lithuania
Orlando Magic draft picks
P.A.O.K. BC players
Helios Suns players